General Yuriy Anatoliyovytch Lebid (born 2 May 1967) is a Ukrainian military officer. Since 2022, he is the commander of the National Guard of Ukraine.

Biography
Lebid was born in Sumy. In 1988 he graduated from the Sumy Higher Artillery Commando School. In 2004 he graduated from the Ivan Chernyakhovsky National Defense University of Ukraine. He went from platoon commander to commander of the Tiger Special Purpose Regiment.

During Euromaidan, Lebid was in command of the Internal Troops Tiger Regiment, which on 9 December 2013 in Vasylkiv broke the blockade of protesters that prevented the arrival of security forces in Kyiv. In the spring of 2014, he was appointed Acting Head of the Eastern Territorial Department of the National Guard of Ukraine. On 12 May, he was kidnapped in Donetsk by unknown gunmen as he was returning home from duty. He was released a week later.

On 13 June 2019, President Volodymyr Zelenskyy appointed Lebid deputy commander of the NMU. On 27 January 2022 he was appointed Acting Commander, and on 25 February, he was named the Commander of the National Guard.

References

1967 births
Living people
People from Sumy
Ivan Chernyakhovsky National Defense University of Ukraine alumni
Ukrainian generals
People of the National Guard of Ukraine